Moulsford is a village and civil parish in South Oxfordshire. Before 1974 it was in the county of Berkshire, in Wallingford Rural District, but following the Berkshire boundary changes of that year it became a part of Oxfordshire. Moulsford is on the A329, by the River Thames, just north of Streatley and south of Wallingford. The west of the parish is taken up by the foothills of the Berkshire Downs, including the Moulsford Downs. Moulsford Bottom and Kingstanding Hill are traditionally associated with King Alfred and the Battle of Ashdown. 

Moulsford Manor was the principal home of the prominent Carew family, who also lived at  Carew Castle in Pembrokeshire. It was used by the American Army Air-Force during World War Two, then a nursing school, before being bought as a private residence for Kevin Maxwell in 1994, who lets it out for the filming of Midsomer Murders. Moulsford Railway Bridge, situated just north of the village on the Great Western Main Line, was designed by Isambard Kingdom Brunel.

History
The Bronze Age 'Moulsford Torc' was discovered in the parish and bought by the Museum of Reading with the aid of a grant from the Art Fund in 1961. It is a hoop-shaped decorative neck ornament, made of four spirally-twisted gold-alloy strips held together by a delicate piece of twisted gold wire.

Moulsford Manor
Moulsford Manor, next to the parish church, was from the Middle Ages until 1497 the principal home of the prominent Carew family, who also lived at  Carew Castle in Pembrokeshire. The house is largely Edwardian, built around a Tudor core. It was a private residence until 1929 when it was used first as a hotel, and then by the American Air Force during World War II. Post-war it became a nursing school and was restored as a private home in 1994, when it was purchased for Kevin Maxwell's wife by her parents in 1994; they let it out for the filming of Midsomer Murders.

Parish church
Moulsford parish church began as a chapelry of Cholsey. The first known record of the chapel dates from between 1220 and 1227. The botanist and geologist John Stevens Henslow was its vicar in the 1830s. In 1846 most of the medieval church was demolished and the current Church of England parish church of Saint John the Baptist, designed by Sir George Gilbert Scott, was built on its foundations. Scott's Gothic Revival building retains the west wall of the original church, which includes a 13th-century Early English Gothic lancet window, and the timber frame of the bellcote.

Other notable buildings
Moulsford Railway Bridge, situated just north of the village on the Great Western Main Line, designed by Isambard Kingdom Brunel and built in 1838–39.  Fair Mile Hospital, a former lunatic asylum at Moulsford from 1870 to 2003, originally named the Moulsford Asylum.  The Beetle and Wedge a former public house, east of the village centre on the River Thames, on the site of a former ferry crossing.

Gallery

References

Sources

External links
 

Villages in Oxfordshire
Civil parishes in Oxfordshire
Populated places on the River Thames